Big Seven or Big 7 may refer to:

Sports
 Big Seven (1938–1946), an unofficial name of the Skyline Conference, also known as the Mountain States Conference
 Big Seven Conference, later the Big Eight Conference, an unofficial name for Missouri Valley Intercollegiate Athletic Association

Other uses
 Big 7, an earlier name of the Big 8, a group of online newsgroup hierarchies
 Big Seven, a 1993 release from The Supernaturals
 Big Seven (United States), an influential group of US nonprofits for state and local government officials
 "Big Seven" (song), a 1972 song by Judge Dread
 Big Seven Group or The Combined, a Prohibition-era criminal organization on the East Coast of the United States
 Big Seven Lake, Seven Lakes State Park, Oakland County, Michigan, U.S.
 Big Seven Ski Trail, a trail of Meagher County, Montana, U.S.
 A mine in Neihart, Montana, U.S.
 Big Seven - 世界の七大戦艦, This was a word used only in Japan, Nickname for the seven dreadnought-type vessels of the United States Navy, Imperial Japanese Navy and Royal Navy which mounted 16-inch guns prior to 1937

See also
 Big Seven Conference (disambiguation)
 Big One (disambiguation)
 Big Two (disambiguation)
 Big Three (disambiguation)
 Big Four (disambiguation)
 Big Five (disambiguation)
 Big Six (disambiguation)
 Big Eight (disambiguation)
 Big Ten (disambiguation)